APRN stand for:

 Alaska Public Radio Network
 Advanced practice registered nurse
 An Phoblacht Republican News
 Blue Apron stock ticker